PBN may refer to:

 PBN (producer), aka Panjabi By Nature, UK-based South Asian music producer
 PBN Broadcasting Network, a media network in Bicol Region, Philippines
 Providence Business News, a weekly business journal in Rhode Island
 Pegboard Nerds, an electronic music group

Abbreviations
 Paris by Night, a Vietnamese music variety show
 Parabrachial nuclei
 PBN file extension – "portable bridge notation" (".pbn") files that are interchangeable with other applications.
 Consolidated PBY Catalina, an aircraft
 PbNation, an internet forum
 Paint by numbers, a common name for nonogram puzzles
 Performance-based navigation
 Private blog network, an SEO technique
 Product batch number
 Pyrolytic boron nitride
 N-tert-butyl-α-phenylnitrone [3376-24-7], a Spin trap compound